Lorentz curve may refer to

 the Cauchy–Lorentz distribution, a probability distribution
 the Lorenz curve, a graphical representation of the inequality in a quantity's distribution